The Spirit Is Willing is a 1967 American horror/comedy film directed by William Castle, written by Ben Starr, and starring Sid Caesar, Vera Miles, Barry Gordon, John McGiver, Cass Daley, Ricky Cordell and Mary Wickes. Based on The Visitors by Nathaniel Benchley, it was released in July 1967, by Paramount Pictures.

Plot

Ben (Sid Caesar) and Kate Powell (Vera Miles) rent a haunted New England house by the sea where their son Steve (Barry Gordon) cops the blame for mayhem caused by the pranks of three mischievous ghosts. Soon after their arrival, a series of strange and increasingly destructive occurrences begin to happen. Not believing in poltergeists, the puzzled parents immediately suspect their son. The real perpetrators are a trio of angry ghosts who want the cabin all to themselves. When the mortal family refuses to move, the ghostly trio (two women and a man) sink two boats belonging to the couples' wealthy uncle. Once again the poor boy is blamed and this nearly drives him insane for he can see the ghosts. More trouble follows when one of the lady spirits falls in love with the uncle.

Cast
Sid Caesar as Ben Powell
Vera Miles as Kate Powell
Barry Gordon as Steve Powell
John McGiver as Uncle George
Cass Daley as Felicity Twitchell
Ricky Cordell as Miles Thorpe
Mary Wickes as Gloria Tritt
Jesse White as Fess Dorple
Robert Donner as Ebenezer Twitchell
Mickey Deems as Rabbit Warren
Nestor Paiva as Felicity's Father
Doodles Weaver as Booper Mellish
Jay C. Flippen as Mother
Jill Townsend as Jenny Pruitt / Priscilla Weems / Carol Weems
John Astin as Dr. Frieden
William Castle as Mr. Hymer
Byron Foulger as Drug Store Owner
Harvey Lembeck as Captain Pederson

See also
List of American films of 1967

References

External links

 
 

1967 films
1967 horror films
1960s comedy horror films
American comedy horror films
American ghost films
American haunted house films
Films about vacationing
Films based on American novels
Films based on works by Nathaniel Benchley
Films directed by William Castle
Films scored by Vic Mizzy
Films set in New England
Paramount Pictures films
1967 comedy films
1960s English-language films
1960s American films